Maximiliano Leonel Rodríguez (born 1 April 1994) is an Argentine footballer who plays as an attacking midfielder.

Club career

Youth career
Maximiliano Rodríguez was part of the youth program at Atlético Madrid from 2007 to 2009. He then returned to his native Argentina and was part of the youth squad of Argentinos Juniors from 2009 to 2011.

Professional career
In 2011, Maximiliano Rodríguez was promoted to the senior squad of Argentinos Juniors. Between 2011 and 2013, Rodríguez made 8 appearances for the club. On 13 April 2013 it was announced that Rodríguez was signed on loan by the Montreal Impact of Major League Soccer for the 2013 Major League Soccer season. The loan included an option for a permanent transfer. Nick De Santis, sporting director of the Impact, said, "He's got a good physique, he's explosive, he's intelligent enough to know how to work both halves of the field,but mostly he's got this great vision."

Honors

Montreal Impact
Canadian Championship: 2013

References

External links

1994 births
Living people
Association football midfielders
Argentine footballers
Argentinos Juniors footballers
CF Montréal players
Footballers from Buenos Aires
Argentine expatriate footballers
Expatriate soccer players in Canada